Gaurotes adelph is a species of beetle in the family Cerambycidae. It was described by Ludwig Ganglbauer in 1889.

References

Lepturinae
Beetles described in 1889